The La Paz Sand Dunes is an  protected sandy coastal desert and beach located in Laoag, Ilocos Norte, in the Philippines.

The area is popular for recreational activities such as sandboarding and 4x4 vehicle riding.

References

Landforms of Ilocos Norte
Dunes of the Philippines